Sabrina Lozada-Cabbage (born 3 January 1997) is a Puerto Rican basketball player for Vitória SC and the Puerto Rican national team. She competed at the 2020 Summer Olympics.

Life 
Born in Twin Falls, Idaho, she grew up in Santa Fe, New Mexico, graduating from Santa Fe High School.
She played for Wichita State University.

She participated at the 2021 Centrobasket Women's Championship. She played for Vitória SC.

She is openly lesbian.

References

1997 births
Living people
Basketball players at the 2020 Summer Olympics
Forwards (basketball)
Olympic basketball players of Puerto Rico
Puerto Rican women's basketball players
Basketball players from Idaho
People from Twin Falls, Idaho
Basketball players from New Mexico
Sportspeople from Santa Fe, New Mexico
Wichita State Shockers women's basketball players
Puerto Rican LGBT sportspeople